Frank Jacob Le Fevre (November 30, 1874 – April 29, 1941) was a U.S. Representative from New York, son of Jacob Le Fever.

Born in New Paltz, New York, Le Fevre attended the public schools and the New Paltz Normal School.
He became engaged in banking.
He served as member of the State Senate in 1902.
He was appointed superintendent of the New York State building at St. Louis, Missouri, during the Louisiana Purchase Exposition.

Le Fevre was elected as a Republican to the Fifty-ninth Congress (March 4, 1905 – March 3, 1907).
He was an unsuccessful candidate for renomination in 1906.
He became president of the Huguenot National Bank at New Paltz, New York, in 1905.
He engaged in banking and fruit growing.
He died in Atlantic City, New Jersey, April 29, 1941.
He was interred in Moravian Cemetery, Richmond, Staten Island, New York.

Frank LeFevre was a descendant of the LeFevres who founded New Paltz in 1678.  The LeFevres were Huguenots, Protestant followers of John Calvin who fled persecution by the ruling Catholics from what is today Northern France and South Belgium.  The original settlement of their ancestors survives today as Historic Huguenot Street, a National Historic Landmark District.

Sources

External links
 Historic Huguenot Street
 LeFevre Family Association

1874 births
1941 deaths
Republican Party members of the United States House of Representatives from New York (state)
Burials at Moravian Cemetery